Marathon Airport may refer to:

Marathon Aerodrome, in Marathon, Ontario, Canada
Florida Keys Marathon Airport, in Marathon, Florida, United States